Roelof 'Joggie' Viljoen (born 22 July 1976) is a South African rugby union footballer who played at scrum-half for the South Africa national rugby union team during the late 1990s. Viljoen, a native of South Africa's Eastern Cape Province, currently resides in New Zealand.

Playing career

See also
List of South Africa national rugby union players – Springbok no. 644

References

1976 births
Living people
South African rugby union players
South Africa international rugby union players
South African emigrants to New Zealand
Rugby union scrum-halves
People from the Eastern Cape
Afrikaner people
South African people of Dutch descent
New Zealand rugby union players
Rugby union players from Port Elizabeth
Blue Bulls players
Western Province (rugby union) players
Northland rugby union players
Falcons (rugby union) players